= Dose verification system =

DVS (Dose Verification System), developed by Sicel Technologies, was an implantable telemetric, radiation sensor. The device was used to measure the amount of radiation that was delivered to tumor and/or healthy tissue. The DVS sensor contained a dosimeter and wireless transmitter inside a sealed, biocompatible glass capsule measuring 0.8 inches (20mm) long and 0.08 inches (2.1mm) across. The sensor was implantable transluminally or transdermally. The device had limited adoption by the radiation oncology community, so sales were thus inadequate for profitability.

The company (Sicel) eventually ceased to exist circa 2011.
